The Toyota N engine is a diesel engine produced by Toyota between 1986 and 1999.

1N
The 1N is a 1.5 L (1,453 cc) Inline 4 diesel engine. Bore is 74 mm and stroke is 84.5 mm, with a compression ratio of 22:1.

Applications

 at 5200 rpm,  at 3000 rpm (Net)
 3rd and 4th Generation Toyota Starlet (NP70/80)

 at 5200 rpm,  at 2600 rpm (Net)

 5th Generation Toyota Starlet (NP90)

1N-T
The 1N-T is a 1.5 L (1,453 cc) Inline 4 Turbocharged diesel engine. Bore is 74 mm and stroke is 84.5 mm, with a compression ratio of 22:1.

Applications

 at 4700 rpm,  at 2600 rpm (Net)

 2nd Generation Toyota Corolla II/Toyota Corsa/Toyota Tercel (NL30)

 at 4500 rpm,  at 2600 rpm (Net)

 3rd Generation Toyota Corolla II/Toyota Corsa/Toyota Tercel (NL40)

 at 4200 rpm,  at 2600 rpm (Net)

 4th Generation Toyota Corolla II/Toyota Corsa/Toyota Tercel (NL50)

References

N
Diesel engines by model
Straight-four engines